Raoul Wallenberg Forest is a New York City park located in Riverdale, New York named after Raoul Wallenberg, a Swedish diplomat who saved thousands of Hungarian Jewish people.

References

Parks in the Bronx
Urban public parks
Riverdale, Bronx